Mount Phoenix, also Mount Phoenicius, may refer to:
Mount Phoenix (Boeotia), adjacent to Lake Copais, modern Greece
Mount Phoenix (Caria), Karayüksek Dağ, in the Bozburun Peninsula, modern Turkey
Mount Phoenix (Lycia), modern Turkey